Ulysses is a 1967 drama film loosely based on James Joyce's 1922 novel Ulysses. It concerns the meeting of two Irishmen, Leopold Bloom and Stephen Dedalus, in 1904 Dublin.

Starring Milo O'Shea as Leopold Bloom, Barbara Jefford as Molly Bloom, Maurice Roëves as Stephen Dedalus, T. P. McKenna as Buck Mulligan, and Sheila O'Sullivan as May Golding Dedalus, it was adapted by Fred Haines and Joseph Strick and directed by Strick. Haines and Strick shared an Oscar nomination for the screenplay.

Making of the film

This was the first film adaptation of the novel, 45 years after its publication.

The film was shot on location in Dublin on a modest budget. Although the novel is set in 1904, the film portrays the city as it was in the 1960s.

Critical reception

Strick earned an Oscar nomination for Best Adapted Screenplay.

The film was entered into the 1967 Cannes Film Festival. It was reportedly jeered at its first screening, but during the second showing, French subtitles in which Molly Bloom described sexual intercourse were seen to have been scrubbed out by a grease pencil, pushing audience sympathies toward Strick who had not been informed of the censorship beforehand. When Strick noticed the deletions during the film's screening, "he stood up and yelled out that this film had been censored", Strick's son David told the Los Angeles Times. "When I went to the projection room to protest, the committee was waiting for me", Joseph Strick later recalled. "I was forcibly ejected, pushed down the steps and suffered a broken foot. I withdrew the film from Cannes."

Reviews from some critics were very positive. Bosley Crowther of The New York Times put the film on his year-end list of the ten best films of 1967, declaring it "A faithful and brilliant screen translation of Joyce's classic novel, done with taste, imagination and cinema artistry." Roger Ebert ranked the film second on his own year-end list (behind only Bonnie and Clyde), writing that it "went into the minds of recognizable human beings and revealed their thoughts about those things most important to them – expressed in the only words they knew." Charles Champlin of the Los Angeles Times wrote that "presuming no familiarity with the novel, the film remains an engrossing experience—very often superbly funny, frequently moving, a confrontation not with three but with more than a score of authentic and credible individuals." Champlin's review concluded, "'Ulysses' is a remarkable achievement, a further chapter in the maturity of film."

Other reviews were negative. The Monthly Film Bulletin wrote that "Joseph Strick's film version is, quite simply, a debasement of the novel. It could not have been otherwise, and Strick must have known this—so why bother in the first place? ... What one misses particularly is a sense of the author's presence, without which the book would be nothing—and without which the film is oddly and insistently impersonal." Pauline Kael described it as "an act of homage in the form of readings ... plus slides."  Stanley Kauffmann called it "a facile and ludicrous reduction."

Rating and censorship 
Ulysses was originally rated "X" in the UK after extensive cuts were demanded by BBFC censor John Trevelyan. However, director Joseph Strick replaced the offending dialogue with a series of screeches and sounds, thus rendering the scenes unintelligible. Eventually the film was released uncut in 1970, and the rating was reduced to "15" for the video release in 1996.

In New Zealand, the film was originally restricted to adults over 18 in gender-segregated audiences. The rating was reduced to "M" (suitable for mature audiences over 16) in the 1990s.

In 1967, the film was banned in Ireland for being "subversive to public morality". The ban was upheld by the Films Appeal Board and placed on the film a second time in 1975. It was eventually lifted in September 2000 at the request of director Strick, although it was screened at the Irish Film Theatre (a private club cinema) in the late 1970s. The first public screening of the film in the country was held in February 2001, with then-censor Sheamus Smith and Strick both in attendance. It went on general release at the IFI from 8 February 2001.

Cast
The large number of characters in the novel is reflected in the large cast of the film. The cast, in order of credit:
 Milo O'Shea – Leopold Bloom
 Barbara Jefford – Molly Bloom
 Maurice Roëves – Stephen Dedalus
 T.P. McKenna – Buck Mulligan
 Anna Manahan – Bella Cohen
 Chris Curran – Myles Crawford
 Fionnula Flanagan – Gerty MacDowell
 Geoffrey Golden – The Citizen
 Martin Dempsey – Simon Dedalus
 Edward Golden – Martin Cunningham
 Maire Hastings – Mary Driscoll
 David Kelly – Garrett Deasy
 Graham Lines – Haines
 Desmond Perry – Bantam Lyons
 Rosaleen Linehan – Nurse Callan
 Joe Lynch – Blazes Boylan
 Maureen Potter – Josie Breen
 Maureen Toal – Zoe Higgins
 Frank Bailey 
 Jim Bartley – Private Carr
 Colin Bird – Private Compton
 Robert Carlisle Jr – Dr Dixon
 Barry Cassin 
 Brendan Cauldwell – Bob Doran
 Mary Cluskey – Mrs Yelverton Barry
 Leon Collins – Vincent Lynch
 Danny Cummins – a drinker in Barney Kiernan's pub
 Brenda Doyle
 Tony Doyle – Lt Stanley G. Gardner
 Meryl Gourley – Mrs Mervyn Talboys
 Don Irwin 
 Des Keogh – Joe Hynes
 Eugene Lambert – Punch Costello
 Thomas MacAnna
 Pamela Mant – Kitty Ricketts
 Peter Mayock – Jack Power
 Paulline Melville
 John Molloy – Corny Kelleher
 Claire Mullen – Florry Talbot
 Ruadhan Neeson – Cyril Sargent
 Maire Ni Ghrainne
 Sheila O'Sullivan – May Golding Dedalus
 Jack Plant – Denis Breen
 Derry Power
 Lilian Rapple
 Charlie Roberts
 Paddy Roche – Madden
 Ann Rowan – Mrs Bellingham
 Cecil Sheehan
 Cecil Sheridan – John Henry Menton
 Robert Somerset – Lenehan
 Ritchie Stewart 
 O.Z. Whitehead – Alexander J. Dowie
 Biddy White-Lennon – Cissy Caffrey

See also
James Joyce's Women (1985)

References

External links

1967 films
1967 drama films
American black-and-white films
American drama films
British black-and-white films
British drama films
Censored films
Film controversies in Ireland
Film controversies in the United Kingdom
Film controversies in New Zealand
Obscenity controversies in film
Rating controversies in film
Films based on Irish novels
Films directed by Joseph Strick
Films relating to James Joyce
Films scored by Stanley Myers
Films set in Dublin (city)
Films set in Ireland
Films shot in the Republic of Ireland
Irish black-and-white films
Irish drama films
Ulysses (novel)
1960s English-language films
1960s American films
1960s British films